The Embassy of Pakistan in Washington, D.C. is the diplomatic mission of Islamic Republic of Pakistan to the United States.

It is located at 3517 International Court, Northwest, Washington, D.C., 20008 (zip code in the US) in the Cleveland Park neighborhood.

The embassy also operates Consulates-General in Boston, Chicago, Houston, Los Angeles, and New York City.

Aizaz Ahmad Chaudhry served as Ambassador of Pakistan to the United States from 2017 to 2018. 
In 2020, the ambassador is Asad Majeed Khan, who presented his credentials to President Donald Trump on January 11, 2019.

The architecture of the embassy building is partly modelled on the Naulakha Pavilion. The Interests Section of the Islamic Republic of Iran in the United States is a part of the Pakistani embassy in Washington, D.C.

From 1951 to 2011, the embassy was located on Embassy Row, in the former Francis B. Moran House (architect George Oakley Totten, Jr., 1909) on 2315 Massachusetts Avenue NW. A chancery annex was located on 2201 R Street NW in the former house of Gardner F. Williams, built in 1906 and also designed by George Oakley Totten, Jr.

U.S. lobbying firm hired
The Pakistan embassy in Washington D.C. hired Holland & Knight lobbying firm in 2019 to promote the interests of Pakistan in the US.

Other Pakistani diplomatic posts in the U.S.
There is also a Consulate-General of Pakistan in Chicago, Illinois, at 333 North Michigan in the Chicago Loop. Its jurisdiction includes Illinois, Indiana, Iowa, Minnesota, Missouri, Nebraska, Ohio, Kansas, North Dakota, South Dakota, Michigan and Wisconsin. In 2015, on the occasion of special events like the Independence Day (Pakistan), the Consulate General of Pakistan, Chicago organized a large event at Daley Plaza, Chicago to celebrate it with over 500 people attending this event. Consul General, Javed Ahmed Umrani assumed charge in September 2018.

Pakistan has functioning consulates in the following cities in the U.S. –
 New York City
 Boston
 Chicago
 Houston
 Los Angeles

Images

References

External links

Official website
wikimapia
Consulate General of Pakistan, Chicago - official website

Pakistan
Washington, D.C.
Pakistan–United States relations
North Cleveland Park